The Laryan narrow-gauge railway is located in Leningrad Oblast, Russia. Limited Liability Company «Tikhvin-Torf» was established on the 16 of November in 2000 and is the successor of Peat enterprise Laryan. The  main  activity  of  the LLC «Tikhvin-TORF» company production  of  milled  peat,  semimanufactures  of  sod peat for household needs, peat semimanufac tures for agriculture. Deliveries of peat are made by rail for the heat-only boiler station of the village Krasava.

Current status 
The Peat enterprise Laryan was established in 1930s in the village Krasava, Leningrad Oblast. The Laryan peat narrow-gauge railway's first line was constructed in 1939, in the area of Tikhvinsky District, Leningrad Oblast from the village Krasava to the swamp peat fields. The peat railway was built for hauling milling peat and workers and operates year-round. The railway operates freight services for the heat-only boiler station of the village Krasava. The railway operates scheduled freight services from Krasava, used for peat extraction tasks such as the transportation of milling peat and workers. In 2014, repairs are being made to the track.

Rolling stock

Locomotives 
 TU6A – № 3134, 3227
 ESU2A – № 623
 Draisine – TD-5u "Pioneer" transportation local residents

Railway cars 
 Flatcar
 Tank car
 Tank car – fire train
 Passenger car PV40
 Open wagon for peat TSV6A and UMW2
 Hopper car to transport track ballast

Work trains 
Snowplow PS-1
Track laying cranes PPR2ma – № 274

See also
Narrow-gauge railways in Russia
List of Russian narrow-gauge railways rolling stock
Gladkoye narrow-gauge railway
Pelgorskoye peat narrow-gauge railway

References

External links

 «The site of the railroad» S. Bolashenko 

750 mm gauge railways in Russia
Railway lines opened in 1939
Rail transport in Leningrad Oblast